The Pocket Veto Case (also known as Bands of the State of Washington v. United States and Okanogan, Methow, San Poelis, Nespelem, Colville, and Lake Indian Tribes v. United States), 279 U.S. 655 (1929), was a 1929 United States Supreme Court decision that interpreted the US Constitution's provisions on the pocket veto.

Background
The Presentment Clause of Article I of the US Constitution states that a bill that the President has not signed and not vetoed becomes law ten days (not including Sundays) after being sent to the President "unless the Congress by their Adjournment prevent its Return, in which Case it shall not be a Law."

The action of the President allowing a bill to expire without signing it after the adjournment of Congress is known as a pocket veto, which had been used by Presidents since James Madison. 

In 1926, the US Congress passed Senate Bill 3185, allowing American Indians in Washington State to sue for damages from the loss of their tribal lands. On June 24, 1926, the bill was sent to President Calvin Coolidge for him to sign or veto. Congress adjourned for the summer on July 3. After July 6, the tenth day after the bill's passage, it had received neither a presidential signature nor a veto. 

Several Indian tribes (the Okanogan, Methow, Sanpoil, Nespelem, Colville, and the Lake Indian Tribes) filed suit in the United States Court of Claims, which ruled that their case had no legal merit. The Indian tribes appealed to the Supreme Court, which agreed to hear the case. Arguing on behalf of the United States, US Attorney General William D. Mitchell argued that the pocket veto was a long-established practice that had been used to decide many important cases. The case was argued on March 11, 1929 and was decided on May 27.

The case hinged on the definition of "adjournment" in Article I.

Decision
In a 9–0 decision, the Court affirmed the lower court's ruling in a decision written by Justice Edward Terry Sanford. It noted that adjournment should be interpreted broadly to mean any cessation of congressional legislative activity. 

See also
 Washington v. Confederated Bands and Tribes of the Yakima Indian Nation
 List of United States Supreme Court cases, volume 279

External links
 
 
 Fisher, Louis. The Pocket Veto: Its Current Status. US Government and Finance Division, Congressional Research Service, US Library of Congress

1929 in United States case law
Native American history of Washington (state)
United States Constitution Article One case law
United States Native American case law
United States Native American treaty case law
United States Supreme Court cases
United States Supreme Court cases of the Taft Court
Veto